Andrew Shaw may refer to:

Andrew Shaw (businessman), president and CEO of the Toronto Symphony Orchestra
Andrew Shaw (golfer) (1898–1983), former professional golfer
Andrew Shaw (ice hockey) (born 1991), Canadian ice hockey player

See also
Andrew Shore (born 1952), singer